Afyon Belediye S.K., commonly known as Afyon Belediye or simply Afyon, for sponsorship reasons HDI Sigorta Afyon Belediye,  is a Turkish professional basketball club based in Afyonkarahisar, Turkey, which competes in the Turkish Basketball Second League, the third tier. Their home arena is Prof. Dr. Veysel Eroğlu Sports Hall with a capacity of 2,833 seats. 

Formerly known as Afyonkarahisar Belediyespor, the team was founded and sponsored by Afyonkarahisar Municipality in 2013. In 2018, the club earned promotion to the first-tier Basketbol Süper Ligi (BSL) for the first time, after winning the TBL promotion play-offs.

Their first season in the BSL, 2018–2019, they finished 14th, avoiding relegation by one point. Their second season, they finished 13th, and in their third season, 2020–2021, they finished 10th. However the following season, 2021–22, the team would be relegated in 16th earning only 4 wins the whole season. The club was scheduled to play in the second tier Turkish Basketball First League, but due to financial issues, did not register. They were relegated again, and are currently due to play in the Turkish Basketball Second League, the third tier, but have failed to do so in the 2022–2023 season.

Season by season

 Promoted as winners of the play-offs.
 Cancelled due to the COVID-19 pandemic in Europe.

Players

Current roster

Notable players

 Cemal Nalga
 Cevher Özer
 Egemen Güven
 Earl Calloway
 Jacob Pullen
 Christos Tapoutos
 Evaldas Kairys
 Edgaras Želionis
 Donatas Tarolis
 Paco Cruz
 Talib Zanna
 Darrius Garrett
 Mihajlo Andrić
 Miha Zupan
 Gregor Hrovat
 Mustafa Shakur
 Quincy Douby
 J. P. Macura
 Wayne Selden Jr.
 Pierre Jackson

Sponsors

External links 
 Eurobasket.com Team Profile

References

Basketball teams in Turkey
Basketball teams established in 1985
Sport in Afyonkarahisar
1985 establishments in Turkey
Sports teams in Afyonkarahisar